Hester Rebecca Nepping (baptized October 9, 1774 - June 15, 1812) was a Dutch serial killer and poisoner who was guillotined in 1812.

Biography 
Nepping was born in Amsterdam in 1774, the only child of master painter Johannes Nepping and Cornelia Schram. At the age of 19, she married tobacco retailer Jan Brummelkamp in Amsterdam. Due to debts, they left the capital in 1800 for Loenen (present-day Hilversum), where Brummelkamp again opened a tobacco shop. After that business also failed, they moved to the village of Hall in 1805, where they both worked at a paper mill.

Inheritance 
In 1808, Nepping acquired a considerable inheritance, including a house in Wijk bij Duurstede and five thousand guilders in cash. The couple moved there, with Jan buying a paper dyeing shop, which again, also failed. In the meantime, Hester had an extra-marital affair with the city messenger, Gerrit Verkerk. The inheritance ran out, and the couple had to take boarders: the elderly Beerenburg-Vinjole couple and their sister-in-law. The couple paid three thousand guilders for the services, with an additional amount to be paid in case they died.

Murders 
Mrs. Beerenburg turned out to be a woman with a nasty attitude, and so Nepping, together with her maid Adriana van Rijswijk, planned to murder the woman. Beerenburg died on August 31, 1811. On November 9, Hester's elderly father, who lived with her, died as well, followed two days later by her husband Jan. The deaths aroused suspicion, and the bodies were exhumed. The autopsy reports indicated that they had been poisoned with arsenic. Nepping and Van Rijswijk were arrested, as was Verkerk, who had provided the arsenic. In January 1812, they were detained in Amsterdam, where the trial was to take place. All three of them made partial confessions, and the Assizes considered two of the killings proven, handing down death sentences to all three of the accused. From 1810 onwards, because of the annexation of the Netherlands to the First French Empire, French criminal law was applied and an appeal had to be made to the court of cassation in Paris. The court upheld the verdict, and on June 15, 1812, all three were publicly guillotined in front of the Nieuwmarkt in Amsterdam. It was the only time that a death sentence was applied that way in the city's history and is often considered to be the first execution by guillotine in the Netherlands, although the guillotine was already used in Maastricht in 1798, but Maastricht was back then an integral part of France.

See also 
 List of serial killers by country

Bibliography
 Meddens-van Borselen, A. "The life of the poisoner Hester Rebecca Nepping (1774-1812)" in: Oud-Utrecht, jg. 71 (1998), No. 5, p. 124-129

References

External links 
 Nepping, Hester Rebecca (2015), in: Digital Women's Lexicon of the Netherlands. Online consultation, February 24, 2015.
 Krabben, A. (2012); Heads roll on the Niuewmarkt, www.isgeschiedenis.nl.

1774 births
1812 deaths
19th-century Dutch criminals
19th-century executions by the Netherlands
Criminals from Amsterdam
Dutch female serial killers
Dutch people convicted of murder
Executed Dutch serial killers
Executed Dutch women
Mariticides
Patricides
Poisoners
People convicted of murder by the Netherlands
People executed by guillotine
People executed by the Netherlands by decapitation
People executed for murder